The William Frangenheim House is a historic house at 410 N. 3rd Avenue in Maywood, Illinois. The house was built in 1906 on a plot previously owned by the Maywood Company, the development company that planned Maywood. It is designed in the American Foursquare style, a vernacular style which was used in many Maywood houses of the period. Like most Foursquare homes, the house has a square two-story layout with a front porch and a hip roof with a dormer. In keeping with its utilitarian style, the house has little external decoration; its interior features Craftsman-inspired wood trim, though it is still relatively plain.

The house was added to the National Register of Historic Places on May 22, 1992.

References

Houses on the National Register of Historic Places in Cook County, Illinois
American Foursquare architecture in Illinois
Houses completed in 1906
Maywood, Illinois